The Gran Premio Industrie del Marmo is a professional one day cycling race held annually in Italy. It is part of UCI Europe Tour in category 1.2.

Winners

References

1988 establishments in Italy
Cycle races in Italy
Recurring sporting events established in 1988
UCI Europe Tour races